Victor Hémery (18 November 1876 – 9 September 1950) was a champion French racecar driver of the early Grand Prix motor racing era.

Life and career
He was born in Sillé-le-Guillaume, Sarthe, France. In 1904 he joined Automobiles Darracq France as their chief tester and helped prepare cars to compete in that year's Gordon Bennett Cup. He drove a German Opel-Darracq to victory at Hamburg-Bahrenfeld.

1905 was his most successful year in his racing career. In August 1905, he drove a Darracq to victory in Circuit des Ardennes at Bastogne, Belgium, and in October 1905 he won the Vanderbilt Cup at Long Island, New York, beating Felice Nazzaro, Louis Chevrolet, and Ferenc Szisz. In 1951 Hémery was retroactively awarded the United States Driving Championship for 1905.

He left Darracq to join Benz & Cie. in 1907 and in 1908 he won the St. Petersburg to Moscow race and finished second in the French Grand Prix. He scored another second-place finish behind Louis Wagner at the United States Grand Prix in Savannah, Georgia. On 8 November 1909 he set another new speed record at Brooklands of  driving the famous "Blitzen Benz" (German for "Lightning Benz"). In 1910 his Benz team finished 1-2 at the United States Grand Prix, just 1.42 seconds behind winner David Bruce-Brown, the closest Grand Prix to date at the time. In 1911, Hémery won the Grand Prix de France at Circuit de la Sarthe in a FIAT S61.

Victor Hémery died at Le Mans, France, on 9 September 1950, aged 73 years.

References

1876 births
1950 deaths
French racing drivers
Land speed record people
Grand Prix drivers